Muddula Mavayya is a 1989 Indian Telugu-language drama film produced by S. Gopal Reddy under the Bhargav Art Productions banner and directed by Kodi Ramakrishna. It stars Nandamuri Balakrishna, Vijayashanti  and musical score by K. V. Mahadevan. The film was a remake of the Tamil film En Thangachi Padichava which was also remade in Hindi as Aaj Ka Arjun starring Amitabh Bachchan; in Kannada as Ravimama starring V. Ravichandran and in Bengali as Pabitra Papi starring Prosenjit.

Plot
The film begins in a village where Zamindar Ranga Rao is a vandal who complots to squat it for the construction of his liquor factory. An inspector is new to the place, receives quietude from the public, and precedes Ranga Rao when he is debased. Accordingly he priors a case of criminal Raja who is under a penalty on murder convict. Aside from that, Ranga Rao hounds the villagers to nullify whilst Raja backs and finger-wages Ranga Rao with valor. Forthwith, the Inspector questions Raja then, he reels the rearward. Raja is wholehearted in his life for his sibling Lakshmi. The two are left alone in childhood and for their life-support, Raja befits as the pickpocket. Furthermore, he crushes a beauty, Vidya. Meanwhile, Lakshmi arrives and observes the oppression of Ranga Rao on villagers which she defies. After admonition by Raja, she gets back to college. To pay back, Ranga Rao works with his son Chinna the mate of Lakshmi who artifices love with her. He silently knits her with the blessing of Raja and flees. 

Following, afflicted Lakshmi conceives, and over a course of time, she finds Chinna’s presence at his residence. Pronto, Lakshmi rushes when she is aware of Ranga Rao’s malice. Unfortunately, they detect and stab her, and when outraged Raja kills Chinna. Lakshmi passes away giving birth to the child and before dying, she takes a word from Raja to free the slave-driven villagers from Ranga Rao. Listening to it, Inspector promises to support Raja in his fight against tyranny. Initially, Raja gleefully embraces his nephew growing under the guardianship of Vidya. In the next step, Raja takes possession of testaments written by villagers for that Ranga Rao abduct the child. Moreover, Inspector losses his life while rescuing him. At last, Raja hiatus his rues and ceases him. Finally, the movie ends with Raja making the boy conduct the funeral rites of Ranga Rao.

Cast

Nandamuri Balakrishna as Raja
Vijayashanti as Vidya
Seeta as Lakshmi
Gollapudi Maruthi Rao as Vidya's grandfather
Raja Krishnamoorthy as Ranga Rao
Anandaraj as Gaja
Subhalekha Sudhakar as Raja's friend
Ahuti Prasad as New Inspector
Brahmaji as Drunkard
Hema
Eeswar Rao as Subba Rao Master
Balaji as Villager
Ravi Kiran as Chinna
KK Sarma as Constable
Telephone Satyanarayana as Old Inspector 
Chidatala Appa Rao as Butler Bajana Sundaram
Kallu Chidambaram as Panthulu
Juttu Narasimham as Butler Gajakarna
Anitha as Raja's mother
Chandrika as Servant
Master Amith as Raja's son-in-law

Soundtrack

Music composed by K. V. Mahadevan. Music released on LEO Audio Company.

References

External links 
 

1989 films
Films directed by Kodi Ramakrishna
Films scored by K. V. Mahadevan
Telugu remakes of Tamil films
1980s Telugu-language films